Eupanacra metallica is a moth of the family Sphingidae first described by Arthur Gardiner Butler in 1875.

Distribution 
It is found from north-western India across Nepal, Bhutan, Bangladesh and northern Myanmar to south-western China.

Description 
The wingspan is 60–73 mm. It is similar to Eupanacra sinuata, but the upperside ground colour is more orange and the lines on the forewing upperside have a different trajectory. Furthermore, the forewing underside is less brown and the basal area is paler. There is a broad, buff band on the hindwing upperside, while the hindwing underside is largely buff with hints of brown.

Biology 
The larvae feed on Arisaema tortuosum in India.

References

Eupanacra
Moths described in 1875